Spring Garden Brook is a tributary of the Passaic River in Morris County, New Jersey in the United States.

Spring Garden Brook flows through the boroughs of Madison and Florham Park.

See also
 List of rivers of New Jersey

Rivers of Morris County, New Jersey
Rivers of New Jersey
Tributaries of the Passaic River